Lophopleura eurzonalis is a species of snout moth. It was described by George Hampson in 1897. It is found in the Brazilian state of Amazonas.

References

Moths described in 1897
Chrysauginae
Taxa named by George Hampson